The ISTAF World Cup is a competition organised by the International Sepaktakraw Federation (ISTAF) to modernise the traditional sport of Sepaktakraw. Alongside the ISTAF SuperSeries, the ISTAF World Cup is a platform to showcase the best of the sport and seeks to broaden the appeal of the sport to the international community.

The first ever ISTAF World Cup debuted in Titiwangsa Stadium, Kuala Lumpur, Malaysia during July 2011 and saw the participation of 36 international teams and a total of 180 athletes.

The winner for the 1st ISTAF World Cup (Men) was Thailand and the runner-up was Malaysia. The winner for the 1st ISTAF World Cup (Women) was Thailand and the runner-up was Vietnam.

Men's draw 
The first round, or group stage, saw 23 men's teams divided into 8 groups of 3 (one group had only 2 teams). Each group featured a round robin of 3 games, with each team playing against every other team in their group once. Based on points accumulated, the top 2 teams from each group advanced to the second round, or playoff stage. The host nation also advanced automatically to the playoff stage.

Women's draw 
The first round, or group stage, saw 11 women's teams divided into 4 groups of 3 (one group had only 2 teams). Each group featured a round robin of 3 games, with each team playing against every other team in their group once. Based on points accumulated, the top 2 teams from each group advanced to the quarter-finals, or playoff stage. The host nation also advanced automatically to the playoff stage.

Participating countries

Men's results

Group A (men)

Group B (men)

Group C (men)

Group D (men)

Group E (men)

Group F (men)

Group G (men)

Group H (men)

Knock-out rounds (men)

Women's results

Group A (women)

Group B (women)

Group C (women)

Group D (women)

Knock-out rounds (women)

Broadcast and media 
Internationally, the ISTAF World Cup 2011 was broadcast throughout 68 countries across the seven continents:

References 

ISTAF World Cup
2011 in Malaysian sport